Amelia Mary Bullmore (born 31 January 1964) is an English actress, screenwriter and playwright. She is known for her roles in Coronation Street (1990–1992, 1995), I'm Alan Partridge (2002), Ashes to Ashes (2008–2009), Twenty Twelve (2011–2012) and Scott & Bailey (2011–2014). Bullmore began writing in 1994. Her writing credits include episodes of This Life, Attachments, Black Cab, and Scott & Bailey.

Early life and education 
Bullmore was born in Chelsea, London, to Jeremy Bullmore, an advertising executive, and Pamela Bullmore (née Green), a gardening writer. She has two older brothers, neuropsychiatrist and neuroscientist Edward Bullmore and documentary filmmaker Adam Bullmore.

She studied drama at Manchester University.

Career

Acting 
Bullmore was part of a cabaret group named Red Stockings, along with Helen Edmundson. While performing at the Contact Theatre in Manchester, a casting director for Coronation Street saw her performance. Bullmore played Steph Barnes in Coronation Street, and was a regular on the show from February 1990 to September 1991. She made brief returns in April 1992 and September 1995. She worked and lived in Manchester for 10 years, moving to London in 1995.

Bullmore appeared in the first series of the BBC comedy series Big Train broadcast in 1998.

Bullmore appeared opposite Steve Coogan as Sonja, the Ukrainian girlfriend of Alan Partridge in the series two of the BBC2 comedy series I'm Alan Partridge. She also appeared on BBC Radio 4's phone-in spoof Down the Line.

From 2011 to 2014, Bullmore co-starred in the crime drama Scott & Bailey. She also wrote seven episodes of the show.

In 2016, she starred in the second series of Happy Valley, playing jealous mistress Vicky Fleming.

Writing 
In 2005, Bullmore wrote her first play, Mammals, which was staged at Bush Theatre and went on to tour the UK regionally.

In 2013, Bullmore wrote a second play, Di and Viv and Rose, which was staged at Hampstead Theatre. Di and Viv and Rose is about the friendship of three women over the course of 30 years, from 1983 when they are in university to 2013. The play eventually transferred to the West End in early 2015, where it ran at the Vaudeville Theatre before closing in March.

Personal life 
In 1993, Bullmore married Scottish actor Paul Higgins. They met in Manchester in 1992 while they were performing A View from the Bridge. The couple have two daughters, Mary and Flora.

Awards

Filmography

Theatre work
{| class="sortable wikitable"
|-
!colspan=4|Actor
|-
!Year
!Title
!Role
!Notes
|-
|1987
|Breaking Rank: Oh Yes We Can by Helen Edmundson
|
|rowspan=2|Red Stockings Theatre Company (Manchester)<ref>{{cite web|url=https://www.genesreunited.co.uk/searchbna/results?memberlastsubclass=none&searchhistorykey=0&keywords=helen%20edmundson&page=3 |work=Genes Reunited |title=British Newspaper Archive (including Breaking Rank 1987 production info |access-date=25 September 2018}}</ref>
|-
|1988
|Ladies in the Lift by Helen Edmundson
|Sarah
|-
|1989
|The Red Balloon by Albert Lamorisse
|Pascal
|Contact Theatre (Manchester)
|-
|1989
|Be Bop a Lula by Bill Morrison
|Sharon Sheeley
|Liverpool Playhouse (Liverpool)
|-
|1991
|The Threepenny Opera by Bertolt Brecht
|
|Birmingham Repertory Theatre
|-
|1992
|A View from the Bridge by Arthur Miller 
|Catherine
|Royal Exchange (Manchester)
|-
|1992
|Romeo and Juliet by William Shakespeare 
|Lady Capulet
|Royal Exchange (Manchester)
|-
|1992
| Major Barbara by George Bernard Shaw
|Barbara Undershaft
|Citizens Theatre (Glasgow)
|-
|1992
|Sweet Bird of Youth by Tennessee Williams 
|Heavenly Finley
|Citizens Theatre (Glasgow)
|-
|1993
|How the Other Half Loves by Alan Ayckbourn
|Mary
|rowspan=2|Everyman Theatre (Cheltenham)
|-
|1993
|All My Sons by Arthur Miller
|Ann Deever
|-
|1993
|Inadmissible Evidence by John Osborne 
|Liz
| Lyttelton Theatre (London)
|-
|1994
|The Queen and I by Sue Townsend
|Leanne/Trish
|Royal Court Theatre (London)
|-
|1994
|Road by Jim Cartwright
|Louise/Linda/Claire
| Royal Court Theatre (London)
|-
|1996
|The Thickness of Skin by Clare McIntyre 
|Laura
| Royal Court Theatre (London)
|-
|2004
|Measure for Measure by William Shakespeare 
|Ensemble
| The National Theatre (London)
|-
|2004
|The Crucible by Arthur Miller
|Elizabeth Proctor
|Sheffield Crucible (Sheffield)
|-
|2008
|rowspan=2|The Norman Conquests by Alan Ayckbourn 
|rowspan=2|Ruth
|The Old Vic (London)
|-
|2009
|Circle in the Square Theatre (New York)
|-
|2010
|Really Old, Like Forty Five by Tamsin Oglesby 
|Cathy
| The National Theatre (London)
|-
|2015
|A Christmas Carol 
|
|Noel Coward Theatre (London)
|-
|2018
| Circle Mirror Transformation by Annie Baker 
|Marty
|HOME (Manchester)
|-
!colspan=4|Playwright
|-
|2005
|Mammals|rowspan=3|N/A
|Bush Theatre (London)
|-
|2007
|Ghosts (Henrik Ibsen adaptation)
|Gate Theatre (Dublin)
|-
|2011
|Di and Viv and Rose|Vaudeville Theatre (London)
|}

Radio work
Actor
 2012: "Sweet Tooth," Book at Bedtime, BBC Radio 4 – Sweet Tooth by Ian McEwan
 2016: "Delamere's Meadow," First for Radio, BBC Radio 4 – Delamere's Meadow by Nina Stibbe
 2017: "The Beard," Drama,BBC Radio 4 – The Beard by Timothy X Atack

Writer
 2007: "Down the Line," BBC Radio 4 – January 2007
 2007: "Cash Flow," From Fact to Fiction,  BBC Radio 4
 2009: "The Bat Man," Afternoon Drama,  BBC Radio 4
 2009: "The Middle," Saturday Drama,'' BBC Radio 4
 2009-2014: "Craven," 15 Minute Drama, BBC Radio 4 – Series 1 (2009), Series 2, 3 & 4 (2012), Series 5 (2013), Series 6 (2014)
 2007: "County Lines (radio play], " BBC Radio 4 – June 2018

Works and publications

Plays

Radio

Other writing

References

External links
 Amelia Bullmore at the British Film Institute
 
 

English television actresses
1964 births
Living people
People from Chelsea, London
Writers from London
English television writers
Actresses from London
English radio actresses
20th-century English actresses
21st-century English actresses
Alumni of the University of Manchester
British women television writers